Consuelo Camarena Gómez (born 27 April 1943) is a Mexican politician affiliated with the National Action Party. She served as Deputy of the LIX Legislature of the Mexican Congress representing Guanajuato, and previously served in the Congress of Guanajuato.

References

1943 births
Living people
Politicians from Guanajuato
Women members of the Chamber of Deputies (Mexico)
National Action Party (Mexico) politicians
Members of the Congress of Guanajuato
20th-century Mexican politicians
20th-century Mexican women politicians
21st-century Mexican politicians
21st-century Mexican women politicians
Deputies of the LIX Legislature of Mexico
Members of the Chamber of Deputies (Mexico) for Guanajuato